Gilla Duibin Mac Cruitín, Irish musician, died 1405. 

The Annals of Ulster note his death:

U1405.1 Gilla-Duibin Mac Cruitin died this year, namely, the ollam of Ua Briain, to wit, one eminent in music and in history and in literary distinction in Ireland.

The use of the term ollamh distinguishes Mac Cruitín as the court musician for the then King of Thomond

References

 Music and musicians in medieval Irish society, Ann Buckley, pp. 165–190, Early Music xxviii, no.2, May 2000
 Music in Prehistoric and Medieval Ireland, Ann Buckley, pp. 744–813, in A New History of Ireland, volume one, Oxford, 2005

External links
 http://www.ucc.ie/celt/published/T100001C/index.html
 http://www.irishtimes.com/ancestor/surname/index.cfm?fuseaction=Go.&UserID=

1405 deaths
14th-century Irish musicians
15th-century Irish musicians
Musicians from County Clare
Year of birth unknown